Convoy PQ 5 was the sixth of the Arctic Convoys of World War II by which the Western Allies supplied material aid to the Soviet Union in its fight with Nazi Germany. The Convoy sailed from Hvalfjord, Iceland on 27 November 1941 and arrived at Archangelsk on 13 December 1941.

Ships
The convoy consisted of 7 transport ships (5 British and 2 Russian) all of which arrived safely, The close escort comprised four minesweepers and distant cover was provided by the cruiser HMS Sheffield

Complete List of Ships
The following information is from the Arnold Hague Convoy Database.

References

 Richard Woodman, Arctic Convoys 1941-1945, 1994, 
 Convoy web

PQ 05